Microlera yayeyamensis is a species of beetle in the family Cerambycidae. It was described by Hayashi in 1968. They are found on Okinawa Island.

References

Apomecynini
Beetles described in 1968